Bowerstown may refer to:

 Bowerstown, Indiana - community in Huntington County, Indiana
 Bowerstown, New Jersey - community in Warren County, New Jersey
 Bowerstown, New York - community in Otsego County, New York